Interstate 40 Business (I-40 Bus.) in North Carolina may refer to:

 Interstate 40 Business (Winston-Salem, North Carolina)
 Interstate 40 Business (Raleigh, North Carolina)
 Interstate 40 Business (Greensboro, North Carolina)